Brian C. Edgerly (born 1943) is an American former baseball outfielder who played internationally with Team USA at the 1964 Summer Olympics.

Edgerly played college baseball at Colgate University, where he majored in philosophy and religion, and captained the soccer, ice hockey, and baseball teams. He was a third-team baseball All-American in 1964, leading the nation in batting average with a .449 mark. In 1964 Edgerly played collegiate summer baseball with the Orleans Cardinals of the Cape Cod Baseball League and was named a league all-star. He went on to play for Team USA at the 1964 Summer Olympics. He was selected by the Boston Red Sox in the 17th round of the 1965 MLB Draft, and played in the Red Sox' minor league system for the Waterloo Hawks in 1965 and 1966. Edgerly was inducted into the Colgate Raiders' Hall of Honor in 1982.

References

External links
Baseball statistics and player information from Baseball-Reference Minor League Baseball Stats

1943 births
Place of birth missing (living people)
Baseball outfielders
Baseball players at the 1964 Summer Olympics
Colgate Raiders baseball players
Orleans Firebirds players
Waterloo Hawks (baseball) players
Living people